Roza Zenziveyeva (born 21 March 1931) is a Soviet former swimmer. She competed in the women's 200 metre breaststroke at the 1952 Summer Olympics.

References

External links
 

1931 births
Possibly living people
Soviet female breaststroke swimmers
Olympic swimmers of the Soviet Union
Swimmers at the 1952 Summer Olympics
Place of birth missing (living people)